Conus grangeri, common name Granger's cone, is a species of sea snail, a marine gastropod mollusk in the family Conidae, the cone snails and their allies.

Like all species within the genus Conus, these snails are predatory and venomous. They are capable of "stinging" humans, therefore live ones should be handled carefully or not at all.

Description
The size of the shell varies between 31 mm and 75 mm.

Distribution
This marine species occurs in the Red Sea and off Sri Lanka and the Western Pacific; off the Philippines and Australia (the Northern Territory)

References

 Sowerby, G. B., III. 1900. New species of Mollusca of the genera Voluta, Conus, Siphonalia, and Euthria. Annals and Magazine of Natural History, series 7, 5:439-441, pl. 11 no. 29
 Wilson, B. 1994. Australian Marine Shells. Prosobranch Gastropods. Kallaroo, WA : Odyssey Publishing Vol. 2 370 pp.
 Röckel, D., Korn, W. & Kohn, A.J. 1995. Manual of the Living Conidae. Volume 1: Indo-Pacific Region. Wiesbaden : Hemmen 517 pp.
 Puillandre N., Duda T.F., Meyer C., Olivera B.M. & Bouchet P. (2015). One, four or 100 genera? A new classification of the cone snails. Journal of Molluscan Studies. 81: 1–23

External links
 The Conus Biodiversity website
 

grangeri
Gastropods described in 1900